North Leigh Football Club is a football club based in North Leigh, Oxfordshire, England.

History
The club was established in 1908 and became members of the Witney & District League. They won the Division Two title, the Ted Young Senior Challenge Cup and the Watts Junior Challenge Cup in 1947–48, before winning the Fred Ford Memorial Cup the following season. In 1950–51 the club were champions of the Premier Division. They won the league again in 1952–53 and went on to win it in each of the next four seasons, also winning the Ted Young Senior Challenge Cup in 1951–52, 1953–54, 1954–55 and 1956–57 and the Oxfordshire Junior Shield in 1956–57. The club then moved up to the Oxfordshire Senior League. However, they later returned to the Witney & District League and were Division Two champions in 1968–69.

Another successful spell in the 1980s saw North Leigh win the Witney & District League Premier Division title and the Oxfordshire Junior Shield in 1983–84, before winning the Premier Division five times in a row between 1985–86 and 1989–90. They then moved up to Division One of the Hellenic League in 1990. In 1992–93 the club were Division One runners-up, earning promotion to the Premier Division. They won the Premier Division title in 2001–02 and 2002–03, but were unable to take promotion as their ground did not meet Southern League requirements. However, after finishing as runners-up in the league 2006–07, the club won the Premier Division, the Hellenic League Shield and the Oxfordshire Senior Cup in 2007–08 and were promoted to Division One South & West of the Southern League.

North Leigh won the Oxfordshire Senior Cup again in 2011–12 and 2016–17. They were transferred to Division One Central of the Southern League at the end of the 2017–18 season. In 2021–22 the club finished sixth, one place outside the promotion play-offs. However, after Welwyn Garden City were disqualified, North Leigh took their place in the play-offs, going on to beat Berkhamsted 2–1 in the semi-finals and Ware 4–2 in the final to earn promotion to the Premier Division South.

Ground
The club play at Eynsham Park, set in the grounds of Eynsham Hall. The ground includes a 175-seat stand named for George Hazell and a covered standing area behind one goal. A record attendance of 426 was set during the 2004–05 season for an FA Cup third qualifying round match against Newport County. A new record of 525 was set for a friendly match against Oxford United in July 2022.

Management and coaching staff

Honours
Hellenic League
Premier Division champions 2001–02, 2002–03, 2007–08
League Shield winners 2007–08
Witney & District League
Premier Division champions 1950–51, 1952–53, 1953–54, 1954–55, 1955–56, 1956–57, 1983–84, 1985–86, 1986–87, 1987–88, 1988–89, 1989–90
Division Two champions 1947–48, 1968–69
Ted Young Senior Challenge Cup winners 1947–48, 1951–52, 1953–54, 1954–55, 1956–57, 1981–82, 1985–86, 1986–87, 1987–88, 1988–89
Fred Ford Memorial Cup winners 1948–49, 1949–50, 1950–51, 1954–55, 1955–56, 1956–57
George Dingle Memorial Cup winners 1972–73, 1986–87, 1987–88
Watts Junior Challenge Cup winners 1947–48
Oxfordshire Senior Cup
Winners 2007–08, 2011–12, 2016–17
Oxfordshire Charity Cup
Winners 1984–85, 1988–89
Oxfordshire Junior Shield
Winners 1956–57 (shared), 1983–84

Records
Best FA Cup performance: Fourth qualifying round, 2016–17
Best FA Trophy performance: First round, 2016–17, 2020–21
Best FA Vase performance: Fourth round, 2003–04
Record attendance: 525 vs Oxford United, friendly match, 9 July 2022
Most appearances: P. King
Most goals: P. Cole

See also
North Leigh F.C. players
North Leigh F.C. managers

References

External links
Official website

 
Football clubs in England
Football clubs in Oxfordshire
Association football clubs established in 1908
1908 establishments in England
Witney and District League
Oxfordshire Senior Football League
Hellenic Football League
Southern Football League clubs